Frederick Tomlinson (18 December 1927 – 17 July 2016) was a British singer, choral director and composer.  He founded the Fred Tomlinson Singers, who sang the music featured on Monty Python's Flying Circus, The Two Ronnies and other British television shows. Tomlinson also composed and wrote songs for Monty Python, including "The Lumberjack Song", which he co-wrote with Terry Jones and Michael Palin. He and his Fred Tomlinson Singers then performed "The Lumberjack Song" on Monty Python's Flying Circus in December 1969, as well as the song "Spam" in 1970 while dressed as Vikings.

Tomlinson was born on 18 December 1927, in Rawtenstall, Lancashire. His father, also Fred (died September 1995), had founded the Rossendale Male Voice Choir in 1924 and conducted it for over 50 years. His older brother, Ernest Tomlinson, was a composer of orchestral light music. Fred won a scholarship to Manchester Cathedral choir school, attending until it closed in 1940 due to the war. He was then (aged 11) admitted to the Choir of King's College, Cambridge, attending King's College School, Cambridge. After that he went to Bacup and Rawtenstall Grammar School before studying music, mathematics, statistics, and the Italian language at Leeds University. 

Tomlinson trained to become a teacher and served in the Royal Air Force in Singapore before embarking on a career in music. He joined the George Mitchell Singers, who were at the centre of a long-running television variety show franchise from 1958, lasting over two decades. He also formed his own vocal quartet, the Northerners, before establishing the Fred Tomlinson Singers in the late 1960s. 

More television work followed, including helping David Croft on Dad's Army and contributing to the music for Are You Being Served?. As well as Monty Python, Tomlinson provided choral music for The Ken Dodd Show, The Goodies and The Two Ronnies, and there were musical contributions to Himalaya with Michael Palin, Timeshift, and The Amazing Race Australia.

Tomlinson had a lifelong interest in the music of Peter Warlock and Bernard van Dieren. He acted as the chairman of the Peter Warlock Society for 25 years. He produced editions of Warlock scores, wrote a companion piece to The Curlew using the same instrumentation, and wrote several books about the composer, including A Peter Warlock Handbook (1974, 1977) and Warlock and van Dieren, with a van Dieren Catalogue (1978). 

Tomlinson composed original music under the name "Frederick Culpan" (his mother's maiden name) including The Chaucer Suite. He was an active member of Equity’s Concert & Session Singers Committee.

He married his wife Pamela Mellor during the mid-1950s, having met her at Leeds. She sang as an alto with the Fred Tomlinson Singers. There were two daughters: Bridget (1957 – 6 October 1990) died in a car crash; and Deborah, a sufferer from Rett syndrome, died in 2011. He lived for many years until his death in Walnut Way, Ruislip. He died on 17 July 2016 at the age of 88 after a long illness, survived by his wife.

References

External links

British male singers
British songwriters
British composers
Monty Python
Alumni of the University of Leeds
People from Rawtenstall
Choristers of the Choir of King's College, Cambridge
1927 births
2016 deaths